Janice Felty is an American operatic mezzo-soprano.  She is known for her interpretations of contemporary composers like John Adams, Philip Glass, John Harbison, and Judith Weir.

In 1987, Felty played the title role in the Handel oratorio Athalia at the Boston Symphony Hall with conductor Christopher Hogwood.  In 1991 Felty premiered several roles in John Adams' The Death of Klinghoffer  and recorded this work for Nonesuch Records.

She appeared in the première of Steven Stucky's To Whom I Said Farewell with the Los Angeles Philharmonic, the composer conducting, Haydn's Arianna a Naxos with the Santa Fe Chamber Music Festival and most recently Colin Matthews’ Continuum with the Los Angeles Philharmonic under Maestro Salonen. Maestro Salonen and she repeated the work with the Chicago Symphony's Music Now series.

References

Living people
American operatic mezzo-sopranos
Place of birth missing (living people)
Year of birth missing (living people)
21st-century American women